-dimensional hypercube is a network topology for parallel computers with  processing elements. The topology allows for an efficient implementation of some basic communication primitives such as Broadcast, All-Reduce, and Prefix sum. The processing elements are numbered  through . Each processing element is adjacent to processing elements whose numbers differ in one and only one bit. The algorithms described in this page utilize this structure efficiently.

Algorithm outline 
Most of the communication primitives presented in this article share a common template. Initially, each processing element possesses one message that must reach every other processing element during the course of the algorithm. The following pseudo code sketches the communication steps necessary. Hereby, Initialization, Operation, and Output are placeholders that depend on the given communication primitive (see next section).

 Input: message .
 Output: depends on Initialization, Operation and Output.
 Initialization
 
 for  do
     
     Send  to 
     Receive  from 
     Operation
 endfor
 Output

Each processing element iterates over its neighbors (the expression  negates the -th bit in 's binary representation, therefore obtaining the numbers of its neighbors). In each iteration, each processing element exchanges a message with the neighbor and processes the received message afterwards. The processing operation depends on the communication primitive.

Communication primitives

Prefix sum 
In the beginning of a prefix sum operation, each processing element  owns a message . The goal is to compute , where  is an associative operation. The following pseudo code describes the algorithm.

 Input: message  of processor .
 Output: prefix sum  of processor .
  
 
 for  do
     
     Send  to 
     Receive  from 
     
 endfor

The algorithm works as follows. Observe that hypercubes of dimension  can be split into two hypercubes of dimension . Refer to the sub cube containing nodes with a leading 0 as the 0-sub cube and the sub cube consisting of nodes with a leading 1 as 1-sub cube. Once both sub cubes have calculated the prefix sum, the sum over all elements in the 0-sub cube has to be added to the every element in the 1-sub cube, since every processing element in the 0-sub cube has a lower rank than the processing elements in the 1-sub cube. The pseudo code stores the prefix sum in variable  and the sum over all nodes in a sub cube in variable .
This makes it possible for all nodes in 1-sub cube to receive the sum over the 0-sub cube in every step.

All-gather / all-reduce 
All-gather operations start with each processing element having a message . The goal of the operation is for each processing element to know the messages of all other processing elements, i.e.  where  is concatenation. The operation can be implemented following the algorithm template.

 Input: message  at processing unit .
 Output: all messages .
 
 for  do
     
     Send  to 
     Receive  from 
     
 endfor

With each iteration, the transferred message doubles in length.

The same principle can be applied to the All-Reduce operations, but instead of concatenating the messages, it performs a reduction operation on the two messages. So it is a Reduce operation, where all processing units know the result. Compared to a normal reduce operation followed by a broadcast, All-Reduce in hypercubes reduces the number of communication steps.

All-to-all 
Here every processing element has a unique message for all other processing elements.

 Input: message  at processing element  to processing element .
 for  do
     Receive from processing element :
         all messages for my -dimensional sub cube
     Send to processing element :
         all messages for its -dimensional sub cube
 endfor

With each iteration a messages comes closer to its destination by one dimension, if it hasn't arrived yet. Hence, all messages have reached their target after at most  steps. In every step,  messages are sent: in the first iteration, half of the messages aren't meant for the own sub cube. In every following step, the sub cube is only half the size as before, but in the previous step exactly the same number of messages arrived from another processing element.

ESBT-broadcast 
The ESBT-broadcast (Edge-disjoint Spanning Binomial Tree) algorithm is a pipelined broadcast algorithm with optimal runtime for clusters with hypercube network topology. The algorithm embeds  edge-disjoint binomial trees in the hypercube, such that each neighbor of processing element  is the root of a spanning binomial tree on  nodes. To broadcast a message, the source node splits its message into  chunks of equal size and cyclically sends them to the roots of the binomial trees. Upon receiving a chunk, the binomial trees broadcast it.

Runtime 
In each step, the source node sends one of its  chunks to a binomial tree. Broadcasting the chunk within the binomial tree takes  steps. Thus, it takes  steps to distribute all chunks and additionally  steps until the last binomial tree broadcast has finished, resulting in  steps overall.

Construction of the binomial trees 

This section describes how to construct the binomial trees systematically. First, construct a single binomial spanning tree von  nodes as follows. Then the children of each nodes are obtained by negating single leading zeroes. This results in a single binomial spanning tree. Subsequently, right-rotate all nodes by  digits. The resulting binomial trees are edge-disjoint and therefore fulfill the requirements for the ESBT-broadcasting algorithm.

References

Parallel computing